Sigurður Ingi Jóhannsson (pronounced [ˈsɪːɣʏrðʏr ˈiŋgɪ ˈjouːhansɔn]; born 20 April 1962) is an Icelandic politician, who was the prime minister of Iceland from April 2016 to January 2017. He is the chairman of the Progressive Party. Since November 2021, he has served as the Minister of Infrastructure. 

Sigurður was appointed as the prime minister on 7 April 2016 following the resignation of Sigmundur Davíð Gunnlaugsson in the wake of revelations contained in the Panama Papers. He was elected as chairman of the Progressive Party on 2 October that year, narrowly ahead of incumbent chairman Sigmundur Davíð.

On 30 October 2016, due to the results of the parliamentary election held the previous day on 29 October 2016, Sigurður announced his pending resignation as Prime Minister. He officially left office on 11 January 2017 and was succeeded by Bjarni Benediktsson.

Biography 
He grew up on a farm in Southern Iceland, trained as a veterinarian at the Royal Veterinary and Agricultural University in Copenhagen and opened a veterinarian practice specializing on farm animals after returning home to Iceland. He was since elected as chairman of the Veterinarian Association of Iceland and also ran the family farm for a number of years. 

Sigurður served as Minister of Fisheries and Agriculture 2013–2016. He is a former Minister for the Environment and Natural Resources, a role which he held jointly with Fisheries and Agriculture until Sigrún Magnúsdóttir was appointed Minister for the Environment and Natural Resources at the end of 2014.

As a result of the ousting of prime minister Sigmundur Davíð Gunnlaugsson following the Panama Papers scandal, the Progressive Party announced Sigurður as the interim prime minister pending the early election in the autumn of 2016.

He has been Minister of Transport and Local Government since 30 November 2017.

References

External links 
Biography of Sigurður on Althing

|-

1962 births
Sigurdur Ingi Johannsson
Sigurdur Ingi Johannsson
Living people
Sigurdur Ingi Johannsson
Sigurdur Ingi Johannsson
Sigurdur Ingi Johannsson